Barajas bombing may refer to 

July 1979 Madrid bombings
2006 Madrid-Barajas Airport bombing